The centipedes or Chilopoda are divided into the following orders.

Scutigeromorpha

The Scutigeromorpha, also known as house centipedes, are anamorphic, reaching 15 leg-bearing segments in length. Also known as house centipedes, they are very fast creatures, and able to withstand falling at great speed: they reach up to 15 body lengths per second when dropped, surviving the fall. They are the only centipede group to retain their original compound eyes, within which a crystalline layer analogous to that seen in chelicerates and insects can be observed. Another distinctive feature is their long and multi-segmented antennae. Adaptation to a burrowing lifestyle has led to the degeneration of compound eyes in other orders; this feature is of great use in phylogenetic analysis.

The group is the sole extant representative of the Notostigmomorpha, defined by having a single spiracle opening at the posterior of each dorsal plate. The more derived groups bear a plurality of spiracular openings on their sides, and are termed the Pleurostigmomorpha. Some even have several unpaired spiracles that can be found along the mid-dorsal line and closer to their posterior section of tergites. There are three families: Pselliodidae, Scutigeridae and Scutigerinidae. Pselliodidae includes just a few species in the genus Sphendononema (=Pselliodes), occurring in the Neotropics and tropical Africa. Scutigerinidae, composed of three species in the genus Scutigerina, is restricted to southern Africa and Madagascar. Most scutigeromorphs from other parts of the world belong to the Scutigeridae, which includes two subfamilies, the Scutigerinae and Thereuoneminae. There are a total of about 96 species and subspecies of Scutigeromorph centipedes.

The earliest known fossil centipedes belong to the order Scutigeromorpha; they have been identified as such due to the morphology of the legs and the maxillipeds.

Lithobiomorpha

The Lithobiomorpha, also known as stone centipedes, represent the other main group of anamorphic centipedes; they also reach a mature segment count of 15 trunk segments. This group has lost the compound eyes, and sometimes has no eyes altogether. Instead, its eyes have a single ocellus or a group of ocelli. Its spiracles are paired and can be found laterally. Every leg-bearing segment of this organism has a separate tergite, these alternating in length apart from a pair of long tergites on each of segments 7 and 8. It also has relatively short antennae and legs compared to the Scutigeromorpha. Two families are included, the Henicopidae and Lithobiidae.

Although they have previously been regarded as wholly carnivorous, feeding primarily on insects but also occasionally slugs and worms, they have been proven to feed on leaf litter, as well as associated small animals.

Craterostigmomorpha
The Craterostigmomorpha are the least diverse centipede clade, comprising only two extant species, both in the genus Craterostigmus. Their geographic range is restricted to Tasmania and New Zealand. There is a single ocellus on each side of the head capsule. They have a distinct body plan; their anamorphosis comprises a single stage: in their first moult, they grow from having 12 trunk segments to having 15. Adult centipedes in this order, like those in Scutigeromorpha and Lithobiomorpha, have 15 leg-bearing segments. Their low diversity and intermediate position between the primitive anamorphic centipedes and the derived Epimorpha has led to them being likened to the platypus. They represent the survivors of a once diverse clade.

Maternal brooding unites the Craterostigmomorpha with the Epimorpha into the clade Phylactometria. This trait is thought to be closely linked with the presence of sternal pores, which secrete sticky or noxious secretions, which mainly serve to repel predators and parasites.

Scolopendromorpha
The Scolopendromorpha, also known as tropical centipedes and bark centipedes, are epimorphic and usually possess 21 or 23 trunk segments with the same number of paired legs. The number of leg pairs is fixed at 21 for most species in this order and fixed at 23 for the remaining species, except for two species with intraspecific variation: Scolopendropsis bahiensis, which has 21 or 23 leg pairs, and Scolopendropsis duplicata, which has 39 or 43 leg pairs. Species in this order have antennae with 17 or more segments. The order comprises the five families Cryptopidae, Scolopendridae, Mimopidae, Scolopocryptopidae, and Plutoniumidae. Nearly all species in the family Scolopendridae have four ocelli (simple eyes) on each side of the head, and the genus Mimops (family Mimopidae) features a pale area often considered an ocellus on each side of the head, whereas the other three families are blind. Species in the family Scolopocryptopidae have 23 leg-bearing segments, whereas species in all other families in this order have only 21 leg-bearing segments (with the exception of the genus Scolopendropsis in Scolopendridae). The only 3 known amphibious centipedes, Scolopendra cataracta, Scolopendra paradoxa and Scolopendra alcyona belong to this order.

Geophilomorpha

The Geophilomorpha, commonly known as soil centipedes, are epimorphic and bear upwards of 27 leg-bearing segments. They are eyeless and blind, and bear spiracles on all leg-bearing segments—in contrast to other groups, which usually bear them only on their 3rd, 5th, 8th, 10th, 12th, and 14th segments—a "mid-body break", accompanied by a change in tagmatic shape, occurring roughly at the interchange from odd to even segments. This group is the most diverse centipede order, with 230 genera. Centipedes in this order each have an odd number of leg-bearing segments ranging from 27 (in the genus Schendylops) to 191 (in the species Gonibregmatus plurimipes). They also have 14–segmented antennae. This order is a monophyletic group including two suborders: the monophyletic Placodesmata, which contains Mecistocephalidae, and Adesmata, which includes the superfamilies Himantarioidea (Oryidae, Himantariidae, and Schendylidae, including Ballophilidae) and Geophiloidea (Zelanophilidae, Gonibregmatidae including Eriphantidae and Neogeophilidae, and Geophilidae including Aphilodontidae, Dignathodontidae, Linotaeniidae, Chilenophilinae, and Macronicophilidae). Segment number is usually fixed by species in the family Mecistocephalidae, unlike the case in other families in this order, in which the segment number usually varies within each species. The name "Geophilomorpha" is from Ancient Greek roots meaning "formed to love the earth."

References 

Centipedes